Alfred Robert Tucker (1849–1914) was the Anglican Bishop of Eastern Equatorial Africa (covering the contemporary countries of Uganda, Kenya and Tanzania), from 1890 to 1899, and Bishop of Uganda from 1899 to 1908.

Early days 

Tucker was born in 1849 and grew up in the Lake District in England. Following in the footsteps of his family, he became an artist, exhibiting at the Royal Academy.

Church life 

In 1879, Tucker became a mature student at the University of Oxford. This was unusual for an evangelical ordinand of his time, as by far the greater proportion of evangelical students went to Cambridge. In 1882, he was ordained curate in Bristol, then at St Nicholas' Church, Durham before being sent out in 1890 by the Church Mission Society to become the third bishop of Eastern Equatorial Africa. He served in this position until 1899. That year, he became the Bishop of Uganda until 1908.

Tucker's style was, notably for this era, one of working with the culture rather than trying to replace it with European attitudes. He was quoted in 1908 saying, "We are pretty convinced in our mind that we have everything to give and nothing to receive; everything to teach and nothing to learn; moreover we find it very difficult to believe that there is anything good in the pagan races of Africa." He was very much in favour of native garb being used for clergy rather than European cassocks and robes. He argued for African churches to have autonomy, although he continually returned to England for more missionaries, possibly hoping for them to undertake support roles within the church structure rather than the leadership positions that they assumed.

Tucker's approach to the evangelization of Uganda had three phases: conversion of individual African men; church planting; and finally, education.

Latter years 

In 1911, Tucker returned to Durham where he spent his days as a canon of Durham Cathedral. He died in 1914 and was buried outside the cathedral, where a tall Celtic cross marks his grave. It stands in the raised area to the right of the main entrance path.

Bishop Tucker Theological College 

In 1913, a year before Bishop Tucker's death, Uganda's first theological college was formed. On his death, it was named Bishop Tucker Theological College. In 1997, it became Uganda Christian University. In 2004, the university's theology faculty was named "The Bishop Tucker School of Divinity and Theology."

Publications 

Tucker, Alfred. Eighteen Years in Uganda and East Africa. London: Edward Arnold (1908).

References

Sources 
 Tucker of Uganda, by Arthur P. Shepherd (1929) at anglicanhistory.org Full-text book about Tucker

1849 births
1914 deaths
19th-century Anglican bishops in Africa
20th-century Anglican bishops in Africa
Anglican bishops of Uganda
Anglican bishops of Mombasa